Francis Kenna (21 September 1865 – 23 June 1932), was an Australian poet, journalist, and Labor Member of the Legislative Assembly in Queensland. He edited the "Brisbane Worker".

He published Banjo, of the Overflow, a parody of Banjo Paterson's Clancy of the Overflow in 1892, as part of the Bulletin Debate about the true nature of life in the Australian bush. Like many of his poems (including those later published in Phases), it was first published in the Sydney Bulletin.

In 1907 he married Edith Elvira Stamp; they had two sons, Herbert and Vernon. Kenna died in 1932 and was buried in Lutwyche Cemetery.

Works
Songs of a season (1895, Melville, Mullen & Slade; Melbourne)
Phases (1915, Thos S Laidler, NSW)
Poems (no year)
Queensland authors and artists' Xmas magazine (no year; Watson Ferguson, Brisbane) edited by Francis Kenna and issued by the Queensland Authors and Artists Association.

References

Australian National Bibliographical Database (which has 8 entries for works by or about Kenna).

External links
 

1865 births
1932 deaths
Australian poets
Australian journalists
Members of the Queensland Legislative Assembly
Burials at Lutwyche Cemetery
Australian Labor Party members of the Parliament of Queensland